Yvon Le Corre (7 October 1939 – 25 August 2020) was a French painter and navigator. He was also the author of several books and stories.

Biography
Le Corre served as a professor in Marseille, where he instructed Titouan Lamazou and inspired his passion for sailing and travel sketches. Le Corre's expeditions led him to Ireland, Morocco, Portugal, Brazil, Mauritania, and Antarctica. He sailed on traditional wooden boats.

Le Corre was twice offered to be Peintre de la Marine, which he declined. He also declined membership in the Ordre des Arts et des Lettres. He released L'Ivre de mer, a sketch dedicated to his voyages in the numerous ports of Brittany. He won the Prix Mémoires de la mer of the Académie de Marine on 8 March 2012 for this work.

Le Corre lived and worked in Tréguier. He owned the English shipliner Girl Joyce, a 150-year old rig which he restored himself.

Works
Heureux qui comme Iris (1978)
Carnet d'Irlande (1987)
Les Tavernes d'Alcina (1990)
Antarctide (1992)
Irlande. Les Demeures du grand souffle (1994)
Carnets du littoral. Le Cap Sizun. (1997)
Les Outils de la Passion (1998)
Mali Mélo (2000)
Madagascar, ma terre oubliée (2001)
Taïeb, une rencontre au désert (2002)
L'Ivre de mer (2011)
Azouyadé (2015)

References

20th-century French painters
21st-century French painters
1939 births
2020 deaths
20th-century French male artists
21st-century French male artists
Artists from Saint-Brieuc